David John Flitcroft (born 14 January 1974) is an English professional football manager and former player who is the director of football at  club Port Vale.  His older brother is the former Blackburn Rovers and Manchester City player Garry Flitcroft.

A midfielder, Flitcroft began his career at Preston North End, where he turned professional in May 1992. He enjoyed a brief loan spell at Lincoln City but failed to establish himself in the first-team at Preston and was allowed to join Chester City in December 1993. Chester would achieve promotion out of the Third Division at the end of the 1993–94 season, though were relegated out of the Second Division the following season. In all he played 190 league and cup games before joining Rochdale on a free transfer in July 1999. He spent four seasons at Spotland, playing 188 league and cup matches and being named as Player of the Year, before joining Macclesfield Town in July 2003. He moved on to Bury in February 2004, where he would feature in another 108 first-team games and be named as Player of the Year for the 2005–06 season, before signing with Hyde United of the Conference North in November 2006. He made a swift return to the Football League though, as he returned to former club Rochdale as assistant manager in January 2007. He would feature in two competitive games for the club, bringing his playing career to a final total of 29 goals from 527 appearances in all competitions. Aside from one season in the Second Division with Chester, he primarily played in the Third Division / League Two.

Having spent over four years on the coaching staff at Rochdale, Flitcroft followed manager Keith Hill to Barnsley in June 2011 and was appointed caretaker-manager following Hill's sacking in December 2012. He was given the job on a permanent basis and kept the club in the Championship at the end of the 2012–13 season, only to be sacked in November 2013. He was appointed as Bury manager the following month and quickly found success, being named as Manager of the Month for February 2014. He led the club to promotion out of League Two at the end of the 2014–15 season and kept the club in League One the following season. Despite being named as Manager of the Month for September 2016, he was sacked two months later following a poor run of form. He took charge at Swindon Town in June 2017, before changing clubs to manage divisional rivals Mansfield Town in March 2018. He was sacked in May 2019 after the club were beaten in the League Two play-off semi-finals. Keith Hill named him as his assistant at Bolton Wanderers in August 2019, though the pair were not retained beyond the 2019–20 season. He was appointed director of football at Port Vale in February 2021.

Playing career

Preston North End
Born in Bolton, Lancashire, Flitcroft spent time as a child with Manchester City before he began an apprenticeship with Preston North End at the age of 14. He signed professional forms with the club in May 1992. He made his debut the following season at Deepdale under caretaker-manager Sam Allardyce. He was to spend the season briefly involved in the first-team, but instead had a brief loan spell with Lincoln City and then was allowed to join Chester City in December 1993.

Chester City
Flitcroft made eight appearances as Chester pipped Preston to promotion from the Third Division at the end of the 1993–94 season. He credited the competitive dressing room spirit put together by manager Graham Barrow with getting the club over the line. However the "Seals" lasted just one season in the Second Division and were relegated at the end of the 1994–95 campaign. Flitcroft was a regular in the Chester midfield under manager Kevin Ratcliffe, who took the club to an eighth-place finish in 1995–96. Flitcroft scored six goals in 34 games during the 1996–97 season, as Chester reached play-offs, though lost out to Swansea City at the semi-final stage. He featured 49 times in the 1997–98 campaign, scoring five goals, though the club dropped down to 14th-place. He won the Away Travellers Player of the Year award after he scored six goals in 48 appearances during the 1998–99 season. He left the Deva Stadium when he rejected the club's offer of a new contract and instead joined Rochdale.

Rochdale
Flitcroft was sent off for a second yellow card in his home league debut at Spotland Stadium, a 2–0 victory over Southend United. He went on to start 40 league games in the 1999–2000 season, featuring 53 times in all competitions as Rochdale posted a tenth-place finish in the Third Division. He featured 44 times in the 2000–01 campaign, picking up 12 yellow cards and one red card, as "Dale" finished eighth in the league. He signed a two-year contract extension in the summer. He later described Steve Parkin as the best manager he had played under. He lost his first-team place at the start of the 2001–02 campaign, however, due to the central midfield partnership of Gary Jones and Michael Oliver and came close to a move to Shrewsbury Town, though ended up staying as Jones instead left the club. Flitcroft started 21 league games, making 43 appearances overall. Rochdale qualified for the play-offs under the stewardship of John Hollins, but were beaten by Rushden & Diamonds in the semi-finals. The 2002–03 season proved to be his best in Rochdale colours, and he was named as Player of the Year after scoring two goals in 48 appearances. Paul Simpson took the club to the fifth round of the FA Cup, where they lost 3–1 to Wolverhampton Wanderers. However Flitcroft left Rochdale in the summer after the club's directors told him that he needed to impress during a pre-season trial in order to win a new contract and by the time new manager Alan Buckley was appointed Flitcroft had already decided to leave.

Macclesfield Town
Flitcroft signed a two-year contract with Macclesfield Town on 9 July 2003 and was immediately installed as captain at Moss Rose. He played 15 Third Division games for the "Silkmen" before losing his first-team place when John Askey replaced David Moss as manager in October. His contract was cancelled by mutual consent in January 2004.

Bury
Flitcroft joined Bury on non-contract terms in February 2004. He played 17 games for the "Shakers" in the second half of the 2003–04 season and signed a 12-month contract in May. He scored his first goal for the club in a 4–0 win over Kidderminster Harriers at Gigg Lane on 30 August 2004, though was sent off later in the match after picking up a second yellow card. He was sent off again for two yellow card offences in a 2–0 defeat at Northampton Town on 28 December. He signed a one-year contract in July 2005 after making 40 appearances throughout the 2004–05 season. He played 46 games during the 2005–06 season and was sent off in the FA Cup against Scunthorpe United. He was named as the club's Player of the Year for what the Bury Times described "his wholehearted and consistent displays in the Shakers' engine room". He also won the club's Goal of the Season award for his long-range goal at Darlington on 22 April – his only goal of the campaign. He signed a new one-year contract in June 2006. He left Bury, his last professional club as a player, in November 2006 after falling out of favour with manager Chris Casper and admitted it was "a massive wrench" to leave, saying that he had been focusing too much on mentoring youngsters during the 2006–07 season and had neglected his own performances.

Hyde United
Flitcroft joined Conference North club Hyde United and made his debut for the "Tigers" in the FA Trophy on 28 November 2006, playing "a superb game" in a 3–0 win at Chasetown. He made his home debut at Ewen Fields on 9 December, picking up an assist for Paul Gedman's equalising goal in a 1–1 draw with Scarborough. He played his final game for the club on 1 January, in a 7–3 victory at Stalybridge Celtic. He played a total of seven games for Hyde, three of which ended in victories.

Return to Rochdale
Flitcroft returned to Rochdale as assistant manager to Keith Hill midway through the 2006–07 season. Rochdale lost the 2008 League Two play-off final at Wembley Stadium and Flitcroft later said that "the feeling was that we had let everyone down". Towards the end of the 2008–09 season Flitcroft came on as substitute in the last scheduled game of the season at home to fellow play-off rivals Gillingham. The following season, he started a Football League Trophy game against Bradford City in what proved to be his final match as a professional. After retiring as a player, Flitcroft joined the coaching staff at Rochdale. Rochdale were promoted out of League Two at the end of the 2009–10 campaign and posted a club record high finish of tenth in League One in the 2010–11 season.

Style of play
Flitcroft was a tough tackling midfielder. His limited skill set meant he rarely featured above the fourth tier, though his work-rate and consistency kept him in the professional game. He was nicknamed "Flicker".

Managerial career

Barnsley
On 1 June 2011, Flitcroft was appointed assistant manager at Barnsley, following manager Keith Hill from Rochdale to Oakwell. He was made caretaker-manager of Barnsley after Hill was sacked on 29 December 2012. He said "Hilly getting sacked... really floored me" and that he had intended to leave but Hill persuaded him to stay on as caretaker as the two men remained close friends. After two wins in three games as caretaker-manager, Flitcroft was appointed to the position on a permanent basis on 13 January. The club had come close to appointing Sean O'Driscoll and Terry Butcher but resorted to Flitcroft after those negotiations broke down. Promising centre-back John Stones was sold to Everton at the end of the month. Flitcroft brought in striker Jason Scotland, who had secured his release from Ipswich Town, and signed Chris O'Grady on loan from Sheffield Wednesday, who would later be signed permanently for £300,000. The "Tykes" reached the quarter-finals of the FA Cup, where they were beaten 5–0 by Manchester City at the City of Manchester Stadium, with Carlos Tevez scoring a hat-trick. Flitcroft guided Barnsley to Championship safety on the final game of the 2012–13 season with a 2–2 draw at Huddersfield Town and stated that it was "Mission Impossible achieved".

In addition to O'Grady, Flitcroft spent £250,000 on Dale Jennings from Bayern Munich II in June 2013. Included in his free signings were Lewin Nyatanga, Jean-Yves Mvoto and Marcus Pedersen, whilst Paddy McCourt and Peter Ramage signed on loan. On 30 November 2013, Flitcroft was sacked after a 3–0 home defeat to Birmingham City left Barnsley bottom of the Championship.

Bury
Flitcroft was appointed as manager of Bury on 9 December 2013, who were then 20th in League Two. He told the press that his team were too inexperienced and he wanted to bring in "that middle range – that bracket of 25 to 30-year-olds that have been around the game and know the game, but are still dynamic". However he also acknowledged that the squad was too big and that players would have to leave. In the January transfer window he released five players – Gareth Roberts, Shaun Harrad, Marlon Jackson, Euan Holden and Jessy Reindorf, and renovated the defence by signing Pablo Mills, Robbie McIntyre, James Burke, Frédéric Veseli and Jim McNulty. He was named as League Two Manager of the Month for February after overseeing an unbeaten month that gained the club 11 points, including a 4–1 win at Mansfield Town. Bury ended the 2013–14 season in 12th-place.

Backed by ambitious owner Stewart Day, Flitcroft signed experienced players such as Kelvin Etuhu, Nicky Adams, Ryan Lowe and Shwan Jalal; Flitcroft said that "we’re in League Two, but we try and behave like a Championship club". The club spent £100,000 on improving the pitch and dressing rooms, whilst long-distance coach journeys were replaced by flights. Bury enjoyed a positive start to their promotion campaign, though Flitcroft said that "I don’t know who thinks we’re going to win every game this season. They're deluded, they're unintelligent and it’s not going to happen". He signed Hallam Hope in November, initially on loan, and dismissed questions over the club spending beyond its means. He was nominated for another Manager of the Month for February as the team went the month unbeaten to close the gap to first-place to six points. Flitcroft led Bury to promotion into League One with a 1–0 win over Tranmere Rovers on the final day of the 2014–15 season, securing the third automatic promotion place behind Shrewsbury Town and Burton Albion.

Flitcroft strengthened for the 2015–16 League One campaign by signing strikers Leon Clarke and Tom Pope, midfielders Jacob Mellis and Danny Pugh, as well as defenders Peter Clarke and Reece Brown. Bury went ten league games unbeaten in September and part of October. Bury ended the season in 16th-place. In preparation for the 2016–17 campaign, Flitcroft released six players and brought in a number of new signings, including: Antony Kay, Greg Leigh, Leon Barnett, Neil Danns, Paul Rachubka, Chris Brown and James Vaughan. Flitcroft was named as League One Manager of the Month for September 2016 after overseeing five wins from five games that the League Managers Association described as "guided by Flitcroft’s beliefs in attacking play and some shrewd moves at the end of the transfer window". On 16 November, Flitcroft was sacked after a run of 11 games without a win that coincided with a series of injuries to first-team players such as Tom Pope, Danny Mayor and Nathan Cameron. Gareth Southgate's promotion to England manager left a vacancy for the head coach role of the under-21 team and Flitcroft applied for the position, making into the final four of the interview process, though the job instead went to Aidy Boothroyd.

Swindon Town
On 5 June 2017, Flitcroft was appointed as manager of Swindon Town, who had sacked Luke Williams following the club's relegation into League Two. A club statement said that: "David has been given a very competitive budget and will now begin the job of putting a squad together with the aim of competing at the top of League Two." In the summer transfer window he signed goalkeeper Reice Charles-Cook; defenders Olly Lancashire, Ben Purkiss, Chris Robertson and Kyle Knoyle; midfielders James Dunne, Matthew Taylor and Amine Linganzi; and forwards Paul Mullin, Donal McDermott and Kaiyne Woolery. He further strengthened his front line in the January transfer window by bringing in Marc Richards and Keshi Anderson (who was already at the County Ground on loan). The "Robins" were seventh in the table when Flitcroft was appointed as manager at League Two promotion rivals Mansfield Town on 1 March 2018, who paid Swindon a compensation package to secure his release.

Mansfield Town
Flitcroft was appointed as Mansfield Town manager on 1 March 2018, following the resignation of Steve Evans. Flitcroft presided over a poor run of form with the "Stags" picking up just three points from his first seven games in charge. The team failed to win a home game at Field Mill in what remained of the 2017–18 season, and though they did go unbeaten in their final five matches home and away they finished three points outside the League Two play-offs in eighth-place. At the end of the season, amidst pressure from fans, Flitcroft promised to build a "promotion winning squad".

Eight players departed, whilst Flitcroft brought in defender Matt Preston and midfielder Neal Bishop on free transfers, whilst spending undisclosed fees to bring in attackers Otis Khan and Craig Davies. The most crucial signing proved to be a loanee however, as Nottingham Forest's Tyler Walker would finish as top-scorer with 26 goals in all competitions. Mansfield went on to finish in fourth-place, winning praise for their entertaining football whilst also keeping 18 clean sheets. Flitcroft was sacked on 14 May 2019, two days after Mansfield lost a penalty shoot-out to Newport County in the play-off semi-finals.

Bolton Wanderers (assistant)
On 31 August 2019, Flitcroft was named assistant to new manager Keith Hill at his hometown team, Bolton Wanderers, the duo working together once again after spells together at both Rochdale and Barnsley. On 12 June 2020, Bolton Wanderers confirmed that both men would not be given new contracts after the club's relegation out of League One.

Port Vale (director of football)
On 8 February 2021, Flitcroft was appointed as director of football at Port Vale. He had initially applied for the vacant managerial role until club chair Carol Shanahan decided to instead appoint him to manage the club's football operations and to link the board of directors with the first-team. Flitcroft told the press that his targets would be to appoint a manager, improve player recruitment and to ensure the playing squad suffered less injuries. Darrell Clarke was appointed as manager seven days later and the club paid Walsall a compensation fee in order to sign him.

Clarke and Flitcroft recruited 12 players for the start of the 2021–22 season: goalkeepers Lucas Covolan and Aidan Stone; defenders Lewis Cass, Ryan Johnson, Aaron Martin, Dan Jones and Mal Benning; midfielders Ben Garrity, Brad Walker and Tom Pett; and strikers Jamie Proctor and James Wilson. Nine players left the club in the January transfer window, whilst eight signings were made: goalkeeper Tomáš Holý (loan); defenders Connor Hall, Chris Hussey and Sammy Robinson; midfielders Joel Cooper (loan) and Harry Charsley; and strikers Kian Harratt and Ryan Edmondson (both on loan). Vale secured promotion with victory in the 2022 League Two play-off final. He helped to oversee seven permanent signings and six loan singings to prepare the club for League One in the 2022–23 season, whilst six first-team players were moved on.

Style of management
Flitcroft has been described as "creative... articulate, engaging and big on lateral thinking", citing Steve Jobs as an influence. He has high attention to detail and is not afraid to challenge upper management. He is flexible in his use of formations. He has a reputation for playing attractive football. He likes to create a family atmosphere at his clubs, motivating the dressing room by creating a close bond between players.

Personal life
His older brother is the former Blackburn Rovers and Manchester City player Garry Flitcroft. Younger brother, Steve, played for Accrington Stanley. The brothers ran a property development business with their father, John. He also has run a football academy in Bolton called FC Strikerz, which he set up in 2007 following the death of his father. He married Joanne. They have two sons, Billy and Bobby, who are both former Barnsley mascots.

Career statistics

Managerial statistics

Honours

As a player
Awards
Rochdale A.F.C. Player of the Year: 2002–03
Bury F.C. Player of the Year: 2005–06

Chester City
Football League Third Division second-place promotion: 1993–94

As a manager
Awards
EFL League Two Manager of the Month: February 2014
EFL League One Manager of the Month: September 2016

Bury
League Two third-place promotion: 2014–15

References

1974 births
Living people
Footballers from Bolton
English footballers
Association football midfielders
Preston North End F.C. players
Lincoln City F.C. players
Chester City F.C. players
Rochdale A.F.C. players
Macclesfield Town F.C. players
Bury F.C. players
Hyde United F.C. players
English Football League players
National League (English football) players
English football managers
Barnsley F.C. managers
Bury F.C. managers
Swindon Town F.C. managers
Mansfield Town F.C. managers
English Football League managers
Rochdale A.F.C. non-playing staff
Barnsley F.C. non-playing staff
Bolton Wanderers F.C. non-playing staff
Port Vale F.C. non-playing staff
Port Vale F.C. directors and chairmen